The badminton Men's singles tournament at the 2014 Asian Games in Incheon took place from 24 September to 29 September at Gyeyang Gymnasium.

Schedule
All times are Korea Standard Time (UTC+09:00)

Results

Finals

Top half

Section 1

Section 2

Bottom half

Section 3

Section 4

References

External links
Official website

Badminton at the 2014 Asian Games